Jan Pinczura (born 20 October 1960 in Balin) is a Polish sprint canoeist who competed in the 1980s. Competing in two Summer Olympics, he earned his best finish of fifth in the C-1 500 m event in Seoul in 1988.

References
Sports-Reference.com profile

1960 births
Canoeists at the 1980 Summer Olympics
Canoeists at the 1988 Summer Olympics
Living people
Olympic canoeists of Poland
Polish male canoeists
People from Chrzanów County
Sportspeople from Lesser Poland Voivodeship